Sampo Ala (born 18 January 2002) is a Finnish professional footballer who plays as a forward for Ykkönen club Rovaniemen Palloseura.

Club career
A youth academy product of RoPS, Ala made his senior debut on 10 March 2018 in a 2–0 defeat against KuPS. He made his Veikkausliiga debut on 3 April 2019 in a 2–2 draw against KuPS and scored an injury time equaliser.

International career
Ala is a Finnish youth international.

Career statistics

Club

References

External links
 

2002 births
Living people
Association football forwards
Finnish footballers
Veikkausliiga players
Rovaniemen Palloseura players